45 Boötis is a single star located 63 light years away from the Sun in the northern constellation of Boötes. It has the Bayer designation c Boötis; 45 Boötis is the Flamsteed designation. This body is visible to the naked eye as a faint, yellow-white hued star with an apparent visual magnitude of 4.93. The star is moving closer to the Earth with a heliocentric radial velocity of −11 km/s, and is a stream member of the Ursa Major Moving Group.

This is an F-type main-sequence star with a stellar classification of F5 V. It is around 1.6 billion years old and is spinning with a projected rotational velocity of 40 km/s. The star has 1.2 times the mass of the Sun and 1.46 times the Sun's radius. It is radiating 3.3 times the luminosity of the Sun from its photosphere at an effective temperature of 6,435 K. 45 Boötis is a source of X-ray emission.

There is a magnitude 11.53 visual companion at an angular separation of  along a position angle (PA) of 40°, as of 2012.

References

External links
 HR 5634
 CCDM J15074+2453
 Image 45 Boötis

F-type main-sequence stars
Ursa Major Moving Group
Double stars
Boötes
Bootis, c
Durchmusterung objects
Bootis, 45
0578
134083
073996
5634